Chomutov is a city in the Ústí nad Labem Region of the Czech Republic. It has about 46,000 inhabitants. There are almost 80,000 inhabitants in the city's wider metropolitan area. The city centre is well preserved and is protected by law as an urban monument zone.

Administrative parts
Chomutov is made up of one administrative part and is the only such Czech city.

Geography
It lies on the river Chomutovka in the Ore Mountains Foothills. The surface is mostly flat with some hills in the north and southeast of the city. The highest point of the municipal territory is Hůrka , a hill on the northwestern municipal border.

There are several bodies of water on the outskirts of the city. Alum Lake and Velký Otvický Pond are used for recreational purposes.

History
The first written mention of Chomutov is a deed of gift from 1252, when it came into the possession of the Teutonic Order. The Gothic church of St. Catherine built during that era still stands to this day. In 1396 Chomutov received a town charter, and in 1416 the knights sold both the town and the lordship to Wenceslaus IV.

On March 16, 1421, the town was stormed, sacked and burned by the Taborites. After several upheavals and changes of ownership, Chomutov was taken by Popel of Lobkowitz in 1588, who established Jesuit rule, leading to trouble between the Protestant citizens and the town's new overlord. In 1594 the feudal lordship fell to the crown, and in 1605 the town purchased its freedom and was made a royal city. After the Thirty Years' War, Chomutov stagnated. Rapid development did not come until the second half of the 19th century, with advances in the mining and heavy industries.

By 1938 Chomutov had over 30,000 inhabitants. Part of the Reichsgau Sudetenland, it had a population comprising about 95% ethnic Germans. A very small Jewish population, (444 in 1930 – 1.3% of the total population), came under increasing pressure, and Chomutov was declared "Judenrein" on 23 September 1938 by the increasingly pro-Nazi administration. A week later, Chomutov and its surrounding districts were occupied by Nazi Germany as a result of the 1938 Munich Agreement. This broader, north-western border area of what is the modern-day Czech Republic was annexed by Germany and reorganized as the Reichsgau Sudetenland.

After 1945, the previous population, German by a large majority, was expelled. Industrial facilities and large high-rise housing projects were then built to redevelop the area. In the late 1970s an urban settlement was built, linking Chomutov with its neighbouring Jirkov. Following the Velvet Revolution of 1989, the heavy industry significantly decreased its activity, but the environment in and around the town has been visibly improved. The leisure facilities of the area were emphasised, notably Alum Lake, the Zoopark Chomutov and the Bezručovo Valley recreational area.

Since 1 July 2006, Chomutov has been a statutory city.

Demographics

Transport

Roads through Chomutov:
 no.: 7 (Prague–Slaný–Louny–Chomutov–Hora Svatého Šebestiána)
 no.: 13 (Karlovy Vary–Chomutov–Most–Teplice–Děčín–Nový Bor)

Railways in Chomutov:
 no.: 120 (Prague–Kladno–Žatec–Chomutov)
 no.: 130 (Ústí nad Labem–Bílina–Most–Chomutov)
 no.: 133 (Chomutov–Jirkov)
 no.: 137 (Chomutov–Vejprty–Bärenstein)
 no.: 140 (Chomutov–Kadaň–Karlovy Vary–Sokolov–Cheb)

Public transport
Transport around Chomutov is operated by buses since 1995 and also by trolleybuses. The trolleybus net connects Chomutov with neighbouring Jirkov. They jointly operate a transport company (Dopravní podnik měst Chomutova a Jirkova).

Sights

Since 1992, the historical city centre has been urban monument zone. The historical centre is in the shape of an oblong, and is surrounded by arcades. The 1. máje Square with its Baroque Column of the Holy Trinity by Ambrož Laurentis from 1697 is banked by seven statues of saints built between 1725 and 1732.

The city hall is situated in the northwest side and it used to be a commendam until 1607. The city hall is situated next to the Church of St. Catherine built in early Gothic style and finished in 1281.

On the opposite side there is the Church of Assumption of the Virgin Mary, built in late Gothic style between 1518 and 1542. The tower was renovated after the fire in 1525 and rebuilt to Neogothic style in 1874. Nowadays it is used as an observation tower.

At the end of the south side there is the Baroque Church of Saint Ignatius with two towers on the north frontage. The church was built for Jesuits by Carlo Lurago between 1663 and 1668. The building called Špejchar from the 17th century was used by Jesuits as earlier church and it adjoins the east side of the Church of St. Ignatius. Nowadays it is used as a gallery.

There is the Jesuit college south of the Church of St. Ignatius from the 16th and 17th century, which nowadays houses the city museum. The most important building from the Gothic residential houses is the late Gothic house No. 9.

The Zoopark Chomutov borders with the Alum Lake on its north side. The zoo is focused mostly on breeding European and mainly domestic wild animals (wolf, european bison, etc.).

On its peak there is a hotel with a former observation tower.

Notable people

Matthäus Aurogallus (1490–1543), scholar
Franz Josef von Gerstner (1756–1832), mathematician
Ernst Fischer (1899–1972), Austrian politician, writer
Hans Goldmann (1899–1991), Austrian-Swiss ophthalmologist and inventor, rector of the University of Bern
Erich Heller (1911–1990), British philosopher and literary scholar
Marian Korn (1914–1987), printmaker
Ruth Maria Kubitschek (born 1931), German actress
Uschi Nerke (born 1944), German TV host
Petr Klíma (born 1964), ice hockey player
Pavla Hamáčková-Rybová (born 1978), pole vaulter
Simona Kubová (born 1991), swimmer

Twin towns – sister cities

Chomutov is twinned with:
 Annaberg-Buchholz, Germany

 Bernburg, Germany
 Trnava, Slovakia

Gallery

References

External links

 
Cities and towns in the Czech Republic
Populated places in Chomutov District
Towns in the Ore Mountains